WPGS (840 kHz) is a commercial AM radio station licensed to Mims, Florida, serving the Space Coast including parts of Brevard County and Volusia County.  The station broadcasts a classic rock format and is owned by Wpgs, Inc.

Some talk radio programming is heard on weekday afternoons including the syndicated Dan Bongino Show.  Sunday mornings feature Christian radio shows.

WPGS is a daytimer. During daylight hours, it is powered at 1,000 watts, non-directional.  Because 840 AM is a United States clear-channel frequency, on which WHAS Louisville is the dominant Class A station, WPGS must sign off between sunset and sunrise to avoid interference with the nighttime skywave signal of WHAS.

History

The station signed on the air on September 18, 1984.  The original call sign was WNUY.

On May 1, 1986, the station changed its call sign to WPGS.

In 1998 the station served as a critical news center for residents during the fires which claimed many homes and lives nearby. Normally a daytime-only station, WPGS stayed on throughout the danger with the owner at one point climbing the tower to see how close the fires were getting to the community.

In October 2009, WPGS dropped the Talkstar radio network to become part of the Smooth Jazz "Groove Network."

References

External links

PGS
Radio stations established in 1984
1984 establishments in Florida
PGS